Ptilotus humilis is an annual herb in the Amaranthaceae family, native to Western Australia. It was first described as Trichinium humile by Nees von Esenbeck in 1845 but was transferred to the genus, Ptilotus, by Ferdinand von Mueller in 1868.

References

Plants described in 1845
Taxa named by Christian Gottfried Daniel Nees von Esenbeck
humilis